Ateş Hırsızı ("Fire thief" in Turkish) was a Turkish anarchist magazine. The magazine was based in Istanbul. It was published from 1992 to April 1999. Extracts from the magazine were published in a 2011 book, Ateş Hırsızı Dergisi Seçkisi.

References

Books
 Ateş Hırsızı Dergisi Seçkisi (Türkiye'de Anarşist Düşünce Tarihi Serisi - 3), Editör: Can Başkent, Propaganda Yayınları,  (pdf), 978-0-9877973-0-8 (ePub), 978-0-9877973-1-5 (mobi), 122 sayfa, Ekim 2011.

1992 establishments in Turkey
1999 disestablishments in Turkey
Anarchist periodicals
Defunct political magazines published in Turkey
Magazines disestablished in 1999
Magazines established in 1992
Magazines published in Istanbul
Turkish-language magazines